Seongju is a town, or eup in Seongju County, North Gyeongsang Province, South Korea. The township Seongju-myeon was upgraded to the town Seongju-eup in 1979. Seongju County Office is located in Gyeongsan-ri which is crowded with people, and Seongju Town Office is in Seongsan-ri.

Communities
Seongju-eup is divided into 10 villages (ri).

References

External links
Official website 

Seongju County
Towns and townships in North Gyeongsang Province